Reticular pigmented anomaly of the flexures (also known as dark dot disease and Dowling–Degos disease) is a fibrous anomaly of the flexures or bending parts of the axillae, neck and inframammary/sternal areas.  It is an autosomal-dominant pigmentary disorder that may appear in adolescence or adulthood.  This condition is due to mutations in structural/desmosomal proteins found within stratified squamous epithelium.

Dark dot disease is associated with KRT5.

See also 
 List of cutaneous conditions
 List of cutaneous conditions caused by mutations in keratins
 Skin lesion

References

External links 

Disturbances of human pigmentation